Gymnoscelis coquina is a moth in the family Geometridae. It was described by William Warren in 1897. It is found in Queensland, Australia.

Description
Its hindwings are greyish with black spots. The abdomen is pinkish.

References

Moths described in 1897
coquina